{{Speciesbox
|image = Agastache nepetoides - Catnip giant hyssop.jpg
| status = G5
| status_system = TNC
|genus = Agastache
|species = nepetoides
|authority = (L.) Kuntze
| synonyms = 
{{Species list
| Hyssopus nepetoides    lin.  |
|'Lophanthus nepetoides  Benth |
|Nepeta altissima  Schrank  |
|Vleckia nepetoides >Raf.  }}
}}Agastache nepetoides, commonly known as yellow giant hyssop, is a perennial  flowering plant native to the central and eastern United States and Canada. It is a member of the Lamiaceae (mint) family.

As with other plants in the mint family, the central stem is 4-angled as opposed to round. The stem is also hairless, or glabrous, and winged. They are arranged oppositely on the stem and are coarsely toothed. The leaves do not have the fragrance usually associated with some other members of the mint family.

The flowers are greenish-yellow and appear as individual spikes at the end of the central stem and major secondary stems. Only a few of the densely packed flowers are in bloom at the same time.

Distribution and habitat
The plant is native in the United States from Nebraska to the west, Georgia to the south, Massachusetts to the east, and the Canadian border to the north. In Canada, it is native in Quebec and Ontario. Its natural habitat is meadows, lowland woods and thickets, and upland deciduous woods.

Conservation status in the United States
It is listed as endangered in Connecticut and Georgia, and as threatened in New York (state), Vermont, and Wisconsin.

Ecology
The flowers bloom in the late summer and are very attractive to bees.

Native American ethnobotany
The Iroquois use a compound infusion of plants as a wash for poison ivy and itch.

References

nepetoides
Plants used in traditional Native American medicine